The 1959 Marquette Warriors football team was an American football team that represented Marquette University as an independent during the 1959 NCAA University Division football season. In its fifth non-consecutive season under head coach Lisle Blackbourn, the team compiled a 3–7 record and was outscored by a total of 214 to 172. The team played its home games at Marquette Stadium in Milwaukee.

Schedule

References

Marquette
Marquette Golden Avalanche football seasons
Marquette Warriors football